The 2002 Soul Train Music Awards were held on 20 March 2002 at the Los Angeles Memorial Sport Arena in Los Angeles, California. The show was hosted by Arsenio Hall, Yolanda Adams, Faith Evans and Shemar Moore.

Special awards

Quincy Jones Award for Outstanding Career Achievements
 The O'Jays

Sammy Davis Jr. Award for "Entertainer of the Year" – Male
 Dr. Dre

Sammy Davis Jr. Award for "Entertainer of the Year" – Female
 Alicia Keys

Winners and nominees
Winners are in bold text.

R&B/Soul or Rap Album of the Year
 Jay Z – The Blueprint
 Janet Jackson – All for You
 Ja Rule – Pain Is Love
 Alicia Keys – Songs in A Minor

Best R&B/Soul Album – Male
 Usher – 8701
 Ginuwine – The Life
 Jaheim – Ghetto Love
 Musiq Soulchild – Aijuswanaseing

Best R&B/Soul Album – Female
 Alicia Keys – Songs in A Minor
 Aaliyah – Aaliyah
 India.Arie – Acoustic Soul
 Sade – Lovers Rock

Best R&B/Soul Album – Group Band, or Duo
 112 – Part III
 The Isley Brothers Featuring Ronald Isley – Eternal
 Destiny's Child – Survivor
 Jagged Edge – Jagged Little Thrill

Best R&B/Soul Single – Male
 Musiq Soulchild – "Love"
 Jaheim – "Just in Case"
 Brian McKnight – "Love of My Life"
 Usher – "U Got It Bad"

Best R&B/Soul Single – Female
 Mary J Blige – "Family Affair"
 India.Arie – "Video"
 Alicia Keys – "Fallin''"
 Angie Stone – "Brotha"

Best R&B/Soul Single – Group, Band or Duo
 The Isley Brothers Featuring Ronald Isley – "Contagious"
 Destiny's Child – "Survivor"
 Jagged Edge with Nelly – "Where the Party At"
 *NSYNC – "Gone"

Michael Jackson Award for Best R&B/Soul or Rap Music Video
 Missy "Misdemeanor" Elliott – "Get Ur Freak On"
 Eve - Who's That Girl?"
 Jay Z – " Girls, Girls, Girls"
 Busta Rhymes – "Break Ya Neck"

Best R&B/Soul or Rap New Artist
 Alicia Keys – "Fallin'"
 Fabolous – "Young'n (Holla Back)"
 India.Arie – "Video"
 Bubba Sparxxx – "Ugly"

Best Gospel album
 Donnie McClurkin – Live in London
 Yolanda Adams – The Experience
 Kim Burrell – Live in Concert
 Doug and Melvin Williams – Duets

Performers
 Alicia Keys
 Jay Z, Beanie Sigel and Freeway
 Jagged Edge and Nelly
 Usher
 Ja Rule and Ashanti
 Yolanda Adams
 Busta Rhymes, P. Diddy and Jamie Foxx
 A Tribute to the O'Jays: LSG and Sean Levert
 Tweet and Missy Elliott
 Faith Evans

References

Soul Train Music Awards, 2002
Soul Train Music Awards
Soul
Soul
Soul